Hepatocystis vassali is a species of parasitic protozoa that infect mammals.

Taxonomy 

The parasite was first described by Laveran in 1905.

Hosts 

The only known host is the red-bellied squirrel (Callosciurus flavimanus).

References 

Parasites of rodents
Haemosporida

zh:瘧原蟲